Thornhill (for Dewsbury) Railway station, as it was latterly known since the closure (1930) of its sister Market Place Passenger Station in the town centre; was located between  and  stations.

History

The station was the first to arrive in the town, being built by the Manchester and Leeds Railway and opened in 1840. It was built on the main line and had the status of such, not least because of its substantial adjacent goods-handling facility, but within ten years of having been built, its importance was somewhat reduced by the arrival of town centre competition. Its lower volume of business naturally contributed to its lower status generally. It was often confused with other Dewsbury stations, or entirely disregarded. It closed just three years prior to Beeching's closure of Dewsbury central, on the last day of 1961.

Its impressive passenger station was located in what is better known today as Thornhill Lees, on the surviving main line. The original access is still there, albeit with a steel barrier bolted in place, on station road level, between the two bridges, on the east side of the road.

There is on official record, a possible interest in re-opening this facility in the future.

Route

References

Disused railway stations in Kirklees
Former Lancashire and Yorkshire Railway stations
Railway stations in Great Britain opened in 1840
Railway stations in Great Britain closed in 1962